Area code 575 is a telephone area code in the North American Numbering Plan (NANP) for the U.S. state of New Mexico. The numbering plan area (NPA) comprises all of the state outside the Albuquerque, Santa Fe, Farmington, and Gallup metropolitan and micropolitan areas, which use area code 505.

Operation of area code 575 commenced on October 7, 2007, splitting from NPA 505. Area code 505 is one of the original area codes established when the American Telephone and Telegraph Company (AT&T) created the first nationwide telephone numbering plan in 1947, when the code served the entire state.

Since October 2007, the area code has been the last area code in the United States introduced by an area code split. All new area codes added in the U.S. since have been by overlays, in which a new code is added to an existing NPA.

Prior to October 2021, area code 575 had telephone numbers assigned for the central office code 988. In 2020, 988 was designated nationwide as a dialing code for the National Suicide Prevention Lifeline, which created a conflict for exchanges that permit seven-digit dialing. This area code was therefore scheduled to transition to ten-digit dialing by October 24, 2021.

References

External links

575
575